Tenzin Wangyal Rinpoche (Tib. o thog bstan 'dzin dbang rgyal) is a teacher (lama) of the Bon Tibetan religious tradition. He is founder and director of the Ligmincha Institute and several centers named Chamma Ling, organizations dedicated to the study and practice of the teachings of the Bon tradition.

Life
Tenzin Wangyal's parents fled the Chinese invasion of Tibet and later, in 1961, he was born in Amritsar, India.  At the age of eleven, he began dzogchen training from both Buddhist and Bon teachers. He began an eleven-year traditional course of instruction at Bonpo Monastic Center and in 1986 attained the degree of Geshe, the highest academic degree of traditional Tibetan culture. That same year, Tenzin Wangyal began employment at the Library of Tibetan Works and Archives in Dharamsala, India.

In 1988 he began to teach in Italy at the invitation of Chögyal Namkhai Norbu. In 1991, he was awarded a Rockefeller Fellowship at Rice University in Houston, Texas. A second Rockefeller Fellowship followed in 1993.

Tenzin Wangyal has chosen to stay in the United States and teach ancient Bon traditions to Western students.

Tenzin Wangyal has an interest in the interpretation, control and application of dreams and has written fairly extensively on lucid dreaming and dream yoga as well as Dzogchen in Bon tradition.

Bibliography

Tenzin Wangyal Rinpoche (2018). Spontaneous Creativity: Meditations for Manifesting Your Positive Qualities. Hay House.

See also
Dzogchen
Tsa lung
Tummo
Dream Yoga

References

External links
The Ligmincha Institute, founded in 1992 by Tenzin Wangyal Rinpoche
Chamma Ling Retreat Center of Crestone, Colorado, founded in 2001.
The Lishu Institute India, founded in 2006
The Three Doors founded in 2010
Audio Interview Series on Buddhist Geeks

Bon
Lamas
Dzogchen lamas
Year of birth missing (living people)
Living people
Rinpoches
20th-century lamas